Sir Steven Charles Cowley  (born 1959) is a British theoretical physicist and international authority on nuclear fusion and astrophysical plasmas. He has served as director of the United States Department of Energy (DOE) Princeton Plasma Physics Laboratory (PPPL) since 1 July 2018. Previously he served as president of Corpus Christi College, Oxford, since October 2016. and head of the EURATOM / CCFE Fusion Association and chief executive officer of the United Kingdom Atomic Energy Authority (UKAEA).

Education
Cowley won a scholarship to Corpus Christi College, Oxford and graduated with a Bachelor of Arts degree in Physics in 1981. He went on to study at Princeton University as a Harkness Fellow and was awarded a PhD in 1985 for research into tokamaks supervised by Russell Kulsrud.

Career and research
Following his PhD, Cowley completed postdoctoral research at the Culham Centre for Fusion Energy (CCFE). He returned to Princeton in 1987 and joined the faculty at University of California, Los Angeles (UCLA), in 1993, becoming full professor in 2000. At Imperial College, London, Cowley led the plasma physics group from 2001 to 2003, while also serving as a part-time professor. He was appointed as the head of the EURATOM / CCFE Fusion Association in September 2008 and as CEO of UKAEA in November 2009.

On 18 March 2015, he was elected the 31st President of Corpus Christi College, Oxford, his alma mater: he took up the post on 1 October 2016. He is the first scientist to hold the post.

On 1 July 2018, he was appointed director of the Princeton Plasma Physics Laboratory (PPPL).

Cowley's research interests are in plasmas and nuclear fusion, in astrophysical plasmas and the laboratory, such as the Joint European Torus (JET) and the International Thermonuclear Experimental Reactor (ITER). His research has been funded by Science and Technology Facilities Council (STFC) and the Engineering and Physical Sciences Research Council (EPSRC). Cowley co-chaired the National Academy of Sciences assessment of plasma science in the United States.

Awards and honours
Cowley was elected a Fellow of the Royal Society (FRS) in 2014. His biography reads;

His certificate of election reads: 

Cowley was also elected a Fellow of the American Physical Society (APS) in 1998, the Institute of Physics (FInstP) in 2004 and the Royal Academy of Engineering (FREng) in 2014. He was awarded and honorary fellowship of the Institute of Engineering and Technology in 2015.  In 2011, he was appointed to the UK Government's Council for Science and Technology.

In the 2018 Birthday Honours, Cowley was appointed a Knight Bachelor for services to science and to the development of nuclear fusion. In July 2019, Cowley was awarded the honorary degree of Doctor of Science (honoris causa) by the University of Lancaster for his standing as the international authority on fusion energy.

References

 

 
 

1959 births
Living people
Fellows of the American Physical Society
Fellows of the Institute of Physics
Fellows of the Royal Society
Fellows of the Royal Academy of Engineering
British physicists
Alumni of Corpus Christi College, Oxford
Harkness Fellows
Presidents of Corpus Christi College, Oxford
Academics of Imperial College London
Princeton University alumni
Knights Bachelor
Date of birth missing (living people)
Princeton Plasma Physics Laboratory people